Polythea is an Aromanian (Vlach) village and a community of the Meteora municipality. Since the 2011 local government reform it was part of the community of Aspropotamos, of which it was a communal district. The 2011 census recorded 36 residents in the village. The community of Polythea covers an area of 24.293 km2.

See also
 List of settlements in the Trikala regional unit

References

Populated places in Trikala (regional unit)
Aromanian settlements in Greece